Boeslunde is a village on Zealand, Denmark. It is located in Slagelse Municipality. It is located 7 km north of Skælskør, 9 km east of Korsør and 14 km south of Slagelse.

History 
Boeslunde and the surrounding area has a history rich in archaeological finds, from the Nordic Bronze Age, the Viking Age and early medieval times. The area near the hill of Borgbjerg Banke was formerly the site of a defence fortress in the 14th century, and in the prehistoric times of the Nordic Bronze Age it was a holy place where votive offerings were made. Many large ceremonial gold rings from 1000-800 BC have been found here among the votive offerings, from the 1800s to the present. Archaeologists has classified them as "oath rings", even though such artefacts are usually associated with the much later Viking Age. In 2015, two thousand gold-spirals from 900-700 BC was excavated. It is a unique find, not seen before, and it is speculated that the spirals was part of a Bronze Age priest-king's ceremonial attire.

External links 
 Gold spirals are a mystery to archaeologists Press release from National Museum of Denmark
 Field teeming with Bronze Age gold rings Science Nordic
 The hoard from Borgbjerg Banke National Museum of Denmark

References

Slagelse Municipality
Villages in Denmark
Cities and towns in Region Zealand